Acuphis is a genus of mites in the family Ologamasidae. There are at least three described species in Acuphis.

Species
These three species belong to the genus Acuphis:
 Acuphis euarcus Karg, 1998
 Acuphis octornatus Karg, 1998
 Acuphis tetrapennatus Karg, 2006

References

Ologamasidae